The 2019 Saxony state election was held on 1 September 2019 to elect the members of the 7th Landtag of Saxony. The outgoing government was a grand coalition of the Christian Democratic Union (CDU) and Social Democratic Party (SPD) led by Minister-President Michael Kretschmer.

The CDU, SPD, and The Left suffered heavy losses. The Alternative for Germany (AfD) moved into second place with 27.5% of votes, an increase of almost 18 percentage points. The Left fell from second to third place, underperforming opinion polls with 10%. The Greens recorded an improvement to 8.6%, but also fared more poorly than expected. The SPD fell to fifth place with 8%. The election saw a major increase in voter turnout, rising from less than half in 2014 to 66.5% in 2019.

The incumbent grand coalition lost its majority, necessitating the formation of a new government. The CDU subsequently negotiated a "Kenya coalition" with the Greens and SPD. Michael Kretschmer was re-elected as Minister-President on 20 December.

Background
In the 2014 state election, the CDU entered into coalition with the SPD. Since then, Saxony emerged as a stronghold of the Alternative for Germany (AfD), which achieved its best results in Saxony in national elections since. It won narrow pluralities in the state in both the 2017 federal election, winning 27.0%, and the 2019 European elections, winning 25.3%.

In May 2019, the Saxon electoral commission ruled that two-thirds of AfD's candidate list was invalid due to the party's decision to split them across two lists. However, in July, a court partially overturned this decision, ruling half of the party's list eligible.

Parties
The table below lists parties represented in the 6th Landtag of Saxony.

Opinion polling

Graphical summary

Party polling

Election result

| colspan=13 align=center| 
|-
! rowspan=2 colspan=2| Party
! colspan=4| Constituency
! colspan=4| Party list
! rowspan=2| Totalseats
! rowspan=2| +/-
! rowspan=2| Seats %
|-
! Votes
! % 
! +/-
! Seats 
! Votes
! % 
! +/-
! Seats 
|-
| bgcolor=| 
| align=left| Christian Democratic Union (CDU)
| 703,006
| 32.5
| 7.2
| 41
| 695,560
| 32.1
| 7.3
| 4
| 45
| 14
| 37.8
|-
| bgcolor=| 
| align=left| Alternative for Germany (AfD)
| 613,585
| 28.4
| 22.0
| 15
| 595,671
| 27.5
| 17.7
| 23
| 38
| 24
| 31.9
|-
| bgcolor=| 
| align=left| The Left (Die Linke)
| 265,871
| 12.3
| 8.7
| 1
| 224,354
| 10.4
| 8.5
| 13
| 14
| 13
| 11.8
|-
| bgcolor=| 
| align=left| Alliance 90/The Greens (Grüne)
| 192,489
| 8.9
| 2.6
| 3
| 187,015
| 8.6
| 2.9
| 9
| 12
| 4
| 10.1
|-
| bgcolor=| 
| align=left| Social Democratic Party (SPD)
| 166,920
| 7.7
| 5.5
| 0
| 167,289
| 7.7
| 4.6
| 10
| 10
| 8
| 8.4
|-
! colspan=13|
|-
| bgcolor=| 
| align=left| Free Democratic Party (FDP)
| 100,639
| 4.7
| 0.6
| 0
| 97,438
| 4.5
| 0.7
| 0
| 0
| ±0
| 0
|-
| bgcolor=| 
| align=left| Free Voters (FW)
| 98,353
| 4.6
| 2.6
| 0
| 72,897
| 3.4
| 1.8
| 0
| 0
| ±0
| 0
|-
| bgcolor=| 
| align=left| Die PARTEI (PARTEI)
| 12,557
| 0.6
| 0.4
| 0
| 33,618
| 1.6
| 0.9
| 0
| 0
| ±0
| 0
|-
| bgcolor=| 
| align=left| Human Environment Animal Protection (Tierschutz)
| –
| –
| 0.0
| –
| 33,476
| 1.5
| 0.4
| 0
| 0
| ±0
| 0
|-
| bgcolor=| 
| align=left| National Democratic Party (NPD)
| –
| –
| 0.0
| –
| 12,947
| 0.6
| 4.3
| 0
| 0
| ±0
| 0
|-
| bgcolor=black| 
| align=left| Partei für Gesundheitsforschung 
| –
| –
| New
| –
| 11,652
| 0.5
| New
| 0
| 0
| New
| 0
|-
| bgcolor=| 
| align=left| Blaue #TeamPetry Thüringen
| 1,508
| 0.1
| New
| 0
| 7,806
| 0.4
| New
| 0
| 0
| New
| 0
|-
| bgcolor=| 
| align=left| Pirate Party Germany (Piraten)
| –
| –
| 1.6
| –
| 6,632
| 0.3
| 0.8
| 0
| 0
| ±0
| 0
|-
| bgcolor=| 
| align=left| Ecological Democratic Party (ÖDP)
| –
| –
| 
| –
| 6,000
| 0.3
| 0.3
| 0
| 0
| ±0
| 0
|-
| bgcolor=#110077| 
| align=left| Party of Humanists (Humanisten)
| –
| –
| New
| –
| 4,305
| 0.2
| New
| 0
| 0
| New
| 0
|-
| 
| align=left| Dawn of German Patriots – Middle Germany (ADPM)
| –
| –
| New
| –
| 3,948
| 0.2
| New
| 0
| 0
| New
| 0
|-
| bgcolor=#005488| 
| align=left| Party of Reason (PDV)
| –
| –
| 
| –
| 2,268
| 0.1
| 0.1
| 0
| 0
| ±0
| 0
|-
| bgcolor=#FF0000| 
| align=left| Communist Party of Germany (KPD)
| –
| –
| 
| –
| 1,951
| 0.1
| 0.1
| 0
| 0
| ±0
| 0
|-
| 
| align=left| Bürgerrechtsbewegung Solidarität (BüSo)
| –
| –
| 0.4
| –
| 1,630
| 0.1
| 0.1
| 0
| 0
| ±0
| 0
|-
| bgcolor=| 
| align=left| Other
| 2,732
| 0.1
| 
| 0
| –
| –
| –
| –
| 0
| ±0
| 0
|-
! colspan=2| Valid votes
! 2,159,850
! 98.7
! 
! 
! 2,166,457
! 99.0
! 
! 
! 
! 
! 
|-
! colspan=2| Blank and invalid votes
! 28,636
! 1.3
! 
! 
! 22,029
! 1.0
! 
! 
! 
! 
! 
|-
! colspan=2| Total
! 2,188,486
! 100.0
! 
! 60
! 2,188,486
! 100.0
! 
! 59
! 119
! 7
! 
|-
! colspan=2| Electorate/voter turnout
! 3,288,643
! 66.5
!  17.4
! 
! 3,288,643
! 66.5
!  17.4
! 
! 
! 
! 
|-
| colspan=13| Source: Statistisches Landesamt des Freistaates Sachsen
|}

AfD received its highest share of the vote in any state or federal election, while the CDU and The Left both fell to record lows in Saxony. Under normal circumstances AfD should have received 39 seats in the Landtag; however, due to positions 31–61 being ruled invalid and removed from AfD's party list, they had no candidates to fill the final seat. Thus, it remains vacant and there are only 119 seats in the Landtag, one fewer than the standard minimum size.

Government formation
Incumbent Minister-President Michael Kretschmer was considered likely to retain his job, as his party remained the largest in the Landtag. Kretschmer ruled out working with AfD or leading a minority government during the campaign. As the CDU also rejects working with The Left, this leaves a so-called "Kenya coalition" as the only viable option: a coalition of the CDU, Greens, and SPD. Such a coalition has governed Saxony-Anhalt since the 2016 state election. Kretschmer and Green leaders Meier and Günther publicly supported exploratory discussions in the week following the election, and the Greens scheduled a party vote on opening negotiations for 12 October.

On 20 December, the coalition between the CDU, Greens, and SPD was approved by the Landtag and sworn into government, with Kretschmer remaining as Minister-President.

References

2019 elections in Germany
Elections in Saxony